Union councils of Chuadanga District are the smallest rural administrative and local government units in Chuadanga District of Bangladesh. The district consists of 4 municipalities, 4 upazilas, 5 thana, 57 ward, 70 mahalla, 38 union porishods, mouza 376 and 455 villages.

Alamdanga Upazila
Alamdanga Upazila is divided into Alamdanga Municipality and 15 union parishads. The union parishads are subdivided into 126 mauzas and 211 villages. Alamdanga Municipality is subdivided into 9 wards and 18 mahallas.
 Ailhans Union
 Belgachi Union
 Baradi Union
 Bhangbaria Union
 Chitla Union
 Dauki Union 
 Gangni Union
 Hardi Union
 Jamjami Union
 Jehala Union
 Kalidashpur Union
 Khadimpur Union
 Khashkorara Union
 Kumari Union
 Nagdah Union

Chuadanga Sadar Upazila
Chuadanga Sadar Upazila is divided into Chuadanga Municipality and nine union parishads. The union parishads are subdivided into 90 mauzas and 129 villages. Chuadanga Municipality is subdivided into 9 wards and 41 mahallas.

 Alukdia Union
 Begumpur Union
 Kutubpur Union
 Mominpur Union
 Padmabila Union
 Shankarchandra Union
 Titudah Union

Damurhuda Upazila
Damurhuda Upazila is divided into Darshana Municipality and seven union parishads. The union parishads are subdivided into 78 mauzas and 102 villages. Darshana Municipality is subdivided into 9 wards and 21 mahallas.

 Damurhuda Union
 Hawli Union 
 Juranpur Union
 Karpashdanga Union
 Kurulgachi Union
 Natipota Union
 Natudah Union
 Perkrishnopur Madna Union

Jibannagar Upazila
Jibannagar Upazila is divided into Jibannagar Municipality and seven union parishads. The union parishads are subdivided into 76 mauzas and 82 villages. Jibannagar Municipality is subdivided into 9 wards and 9 mahallas.

 Andulbaria Union
 Banka Union
 Hasadah Union
 KDK Union
 Monohorpur Union
 Raypur Union
 Shimanto Union
 Uthali Union

References 

Local government in Bangladesh